Jemari is a village in Salanpur CD Block in Asansol Sadar subdivision of Paschim Bardhaman district in the state of West Bengal, India.

Geography
At the western fringe of the area the Barakar forms the boundary with Jharkhand.

Demographics
As per the 2011 Census of India, Jemari had a total population of 4,321 of which 2,281 (53%) were males and 2,040 (47%) were females. Population below 6 years was 683. The total number of literates in Jemari was 2,255 (61.98% of the population over 6 years).

*For language details see Salanpur (community development block)#Language and religion

 India census, Jemari had a population of 3,865. Males constitute 56% of the population and females 44%. Jemari has an average literacy rate of 53%, lower than the national average of 59.5%: male literacy is 63%, and female literacy is 41%. In Jemari, 15% of the population is under 6 years of age.

Education
Jemari has one primary school.

References

Villages in Paschim Bardhaman district